is a former Japanese football player.

Playing career
Nishida was born in Ehime Prefecture on 30 January 1973. After graduating from Doshisha University, he joined Sanfrecce Hiroshima in 1995. Although he was forward, he could not play at all in the match. In 1996, he moved to newly was promoted to J1 League club, Kyoto Purple Sanga. Although he played as forward initially, he was converted to right side midfielder and right side back and became a regular player. In 1998, he moved to Avispa Fukuoka and played many matches in 2 seasons. In 2000, he moved to Verdy Kawasaki (later Tokyo Verdy). Although he played many matches as right side back until 2001, he could hardly play in the match in 2002. In July 2002, he moved to Consadole Sapporo. Although he played as right side midfielder, the club was relegated to J2 League from 2003. He retired end of 2003 season.

Club statistics

References

External links

1973 births
Living people
Doshisha University alumni
Association football people from Ehime Prefecture
Japanese footballers
J1 League players
J2 League players
Sanfrecce Hiroshima players
Kyoto Sanga FC players
Avispa Fukuoka players
Tokyo Verdy players
Hokkaido Consadole Sapporo players
Association football midfielders